Olei Hagardom (lit. "those who ascended to the gallows") refers to members of the two Jewish Revisionist pre-state underground organisations Irgun and Lehi, who were tried in British Mandate courts and sentenced to death by hanging, most of them in Acre prison. There were 12 Olei Hagardom.

The term does not include members of the Nili organisation hanged by the Ottoman government during World War I.

History
The British Mandate for Palestine was an instrument of government instituted by the League of Nations for the administration of territories formerly under the rule of the Ottoman Empire. British rule lasted from 1917-1948.

During the 1936–1939 Arab revolt hundreds of Jews were killed by Arabs but the Yishuv leadership didn't respond. The militant group known as the Irgun embarked on an intensive armed campaign against Arab targets. Later British targets were added also. With the outbreak of World War II, militant actions against the British were halted, but one of the leaders of the group, Avraham Stern, insisted that the fight must go on, leading to a split in the Irgun which led to the formation of a new group, Lehi (also known as the Stern Gang or Stern Group). In 1944, the Irgun, now headed by Menachem Begin rejoined the fight against the British. After the end of World War II, the larger Haganah joined the fight within a union called the Jewish Resistance Movement, which lasted for just about ten months, from October 1945 until August 1946.
 
The term "Olei HaGardom" refers to the eight Irgun and two Lehi members who were executed during this period and a further member of each group who committed suicide prior to their intended executions. Two of the executions were carried out in Egypt in 1945. With the exception of Ben Yosef, all the executions and suicides within the British Mandate of Palestine occurred in 1947. They were tried under the Defence Emergency Regulations, enacted in September 1945. These regulations suspended Habeas Corpus and established Military courts. They prescribed the death penalty for various offences, including carrying weapons or ammunition and membership in an organization whose members commit these offenses.

List of Olei Hagardom

Original list
Shlomo Ben-Yosef: An Irgun member who was the first Oleh Hagardom. He was arrested after an attack on a bus carrying Arab civilians in Safed. He was executed on June 29, 1938.
Eliyahu Hakim, Lehi member who assassinated Lord Moyne in Cairo. Executed in Cairo on March 22, 1945.
Eliyahu Bet-Zuri, Lehi member who assisted in the assassination of Lord Moyne and killed Moyne's British Army chauffeur, executed in Cairo on March 22, 1945.
Dov Gruner: Irgun member captured during a raid on the Palestine Police station in Ramat Gan. He was executed on April 16, 1947.
Mordechai Alkahi: Irgun member arrested en route to an attack on British officers on the Night of the Beatings. Executed on April 16, 1947.
Yehiel Dresner, Irgun member arrested en route to an attack on British officers on the Night of the Beatings. Executed on April 16, 1947.
Eliezer Kashani, Irgun member arrested en route to an attack on British officers on the "Night of the Beatings". Executed on April 16, 1947.
Meir Feinstein: Irgun member captured after bombing Jerusalem train station. Committed suicide on April 21, 1947 while awaiting execution.
Moshe Barazani: Lehi member caught carrying a grenade, committed suicide on April 21, 1947 while awaiting execution.
Avshalom Haviv: Irgun member captured during the Acre Prison break, executed on July 29, 1947.
Meir Nakar, Irgun member captured during the Acre Prison break, executed on July 29, 1947.
Yaakov Weiss, Irgun member captured during the Acre Prison break, executed on July 29, 1947.

Expanded list
The original list of Olei Hagardom was later expanded after former Irgun commander Menachem Begin became Prime Minister of Israel.
Naaman Belkind, Nili member who spied for British military intelligence during World War I, executed by the Ottoman authorities in Damascus on December 16, 1917.
Yosef Lishansky, Nili member who spied for British military intelligence during World War I. Executed by the Ottoman authorities in Damascus on December 16, 1917.
Mordechai Schwarcz, Jewish police officer who shot dead an Arab comrade, who he claimed had boasted about murdering Jews, executed on August 16, 1938.
Eli Cohen, Israeli spy captured in Syria after having infiltrated the Syrian government, executed on May 18, 1965.

Barazani and Feinstein
Moshe Barazani and Meir Feinstein committed suicide in their prison cell with handgrenades smuggled to them in a basket of oranges. The grenades were placed inside hollowed out orange peels. The original plan was to carry the concealed grenades with them as they were taken to the gallows then use them to carry out a suicide attack, but allegedly after they learned that Rabbi Goldman would be present at the time of the execution, the plan was dropped. Instead, Barazani and Feinstein blew themselves up in their jail cell shortly before the execution.

Irgun and Lehi actions to stop the executions 

The Irgun adopted a policy of hostage-taking in response to British death sentences passed down on its members. After two Irgun fighters, Yosef Simchon and Michael Ashbel, were sentenced to death for raid on the Sarafand army base in 1946, the Irgun seized five British officers as hostages and threatened to hang them if the sentences were carried out. The sentences were commuted. After Dov Gruner and three other Irgun fighters captured during the Night of the Beatings were sentenced to death, the Irgun abducted a British judge and intelligence officer and threatened to kill its hostages if the sentences were carried out. The British announced an indefinite postponement in the executions, and the hostages were released, although the British later hanged the prisoners. In addition, Lehi also managed to get the death sentences of 18 of its members commuted at one point after threatening to kill 100 Britons in response.

After Avshalom Haviv, Meir Nakar, and Yaakov Weiss were sentenced to death for their role in the Acre Prison break, the Irgun kidnapped two British Army Intelligence Corps sergeants, Clifford Martin and Mervyn Paice in Netanya. The Irgun announced that hanging its fighters would result in the subsequent hanging of the British soldiers. Haviv, Nakar, and Weiss were executed on July 29, 1947. The bodies of Clifford Martin and Mervyn Paice were subsequently found hanging from trees in a forest near Netanya. Their bodies had been booby-trapped with a homemade bomb.

Menachem Begin spoke of the event saying: "it was one of the most bitter moments of my life but the cruel action in Netanya not only saved dozens of Jews from the gallows but also broke the neck of the British occupation, because when the gallows break down, the British rule, which relied on it, breaks on its own". After this event, there were no more executions of Jewish militants by the British.

Commemoration 
In Israel the Olei Hagardom are widely commemorated as national heroes. Streets throughout the country are named Olei Hagardom Street or after individual Olei Hagardom, and postage stamps bearing their images have been issued. There are numerous monuments commemorating the Olei Hagardom in Israel. In Ramat Gan, the square in front of the British police station which Dov Gruner was captured while attacking is named Dov Gruner Square and an Olei Hagardom commemoration monument stands which features a statue of a lion cub representing the Yishuv fighting an adult lion representing the British Empire. A moshav in southern Israel is also named Misgav Dov after Gruner. An official commemoration ceremony for the Olei Hagardom takes place on Yom Hazikaron at the memorial in Rishon LeZion, which stands near Olei Hagardom Street, and the Knesset holds an annual memorial service for them. In 2009 Israeli high schools were instructed by the Education Ministry to include studies on the Olei Hagardom as part of their curriculum, which would include national competitions on essays, poems, and drawings on them.

See also
 List of notable Irgun members
 The Forgotten Ten, a similar Irish group

References 

 
Irgun
People executed by Mandatory Palestine by hanging
Terrorism in Mandatory Palestine